Flavobacterium arcticum  is a Gram-negative, aerobic and rod-shaped bacterium from the genus of Flavobacterium which has been isolated from seawater from the Arctic.

References

External links
Type strain of Flavobacterium arcticum at BacDive -  the Bacterial Diversity Metadatabase

 

arcticum
Bacteria described in 2017